or Sonic the Hedgehog the Movie, is a two-part 1996 Japanese original video animation (OVA) based on the video game franchise by Sega. Produced by Pierrot and directed by Kazunori Ikegami, the OVA was originally released in Japan on January 26, 1996 (1st episode) and March 22, 1996 (2nd episode). The series was later licensed and dubbed in English by ADV Films, which released it as a single direct-to-video film on September 7, 1999, to coincide with the international release of Sonic Adventure. The anime features Sonic, Tails, Knuckles, Dr. Eggman (Dr. Robotnik in the English release), Metal Sonic and a few supporting characters created exclusively for the OVA. Taking the English dub into consideration, it is also the first Sonic animated media to not feature Jaleel White voicing the titular character.

Setting 
Unlike other Sonic the Hedgehog media, the setting of the series is in the world of Planet Freedom, which is split into two distinct realms: the Land of the Sky and the Land of Darkness.

The Land of the Sky consists of an unknown number of continents that drift high in the stratosphere of the planet, all of them connected to a massive ice formation which also serves to anchor them to the planet's surface below. According to Knuckles, if this ice network was destroyed, Planet Freedom's rotation would hurl the Land of the Sky into outer space, undoubtedly killing everyone on it.

The Land of Darkness is the actual surface of Planet Freedom, a post-apocalyptic wilderness with the dastardly Robotnik as its sole living inhabitant. The Land of Darkness can only be accessed in one of two ways: by a whirlwind-like "portal" in the Land of the Sky, or via a warp zone, an extradimensional link between two points on Planet Freedom. Most of its terrain is untamed and mountainous, but a crumbling city serves as the location of Robotnik's empire. The city and terrain strongly imply that Planet Freedom is a post apocalyptic Earth that was built upon with floating islands, with certain landmarks suggesting that the ruins are those of New York City.

Plot

Part 1 
Sonic the Hedgehog is relaxing on the beach of South Island with Miles "Tails" Prower, when Old Man Owl arrives with a message from the President asking Sonic to come to his office. Once there, they discover Dr. Robotnik has taken the President and his daughter Sara prisoner. After giving exposition of how Planet Freedom works (explaining the two "dimensions" of the planet, The Land of the Sky, and The Land of Darkness), Robotnik explains that a giant mecha named Metal Robotnik ("Black Eggman" in the original Japanese release) has exiled him from his utopian city of Robotropolis ("Eggmanland" in the original) and sabotaged the Robot Generator, which will explode by sunrise the next day. He asks Sonic to head to the Land of Darkness to stop it in exchange for the President and Sara's lives. Once there, Metal Robotnik tries to stop them from reaching the generator. Knuckles the Echidna arrives and rescues them, and all three team up to destroy the mecha. Unbeknownst to them, Metal Robotnik is revealed to have been controlled by Robotnik, with Sara unwillingly in tow. The episode ends with Sonic, Tails, and Knuckles heading to Robotropolis.

Part 2 
After entering Robotropolis, Knuckles distracts the enemy robots while Sonic and Tails try to stop the generator in the heart of the city. They arrive just in time, but when Sonic pulls the lever, the machine traps him and scans his body. Knuckles frees Sonic just as the machine crumbles to the ground, revealing Dr. Robotnik's newest robot, Hyper Metal Sonic. Dr. Robotnik appears in Metal Robotnik's remains and reveals he lured Sonic to copy his mind, personality, and abilities for Hyper Metal Sonic. Sonic and Metal battle, but Metal easily overpowers Sonic. Tails and Knuckles return to the Land of the Sky, where Tails learns that Metal is out to destroy the planet by digging into the ice caps that hold the Land of the Sky together, allowing lava to emerge and melt the ice. Sonic wakes up in Green Lake City and returns to the Presidential Palace, learning of Metal's goal from the President.

Sonic, Tails, and Knuckles go to the ice caps, where Sara is being held hostage by Robotnik, planning to marry her so the two will rule over Planet Freedom after the Land of the Sky's decimation. Sonic encounters Metal and the two have a lengthy battle. Tails manage to corrupt Metal's data, and Sonic severely damages him. During the altercation, the President and Old Man arrive and are trapped in their aircraft, but Metal saves them. Sonic realizes that Metal does have emotions, as he was programmed with Sonic's persona and instincts. Metal gets blown into a crack and falls into a subglacial volcano. Sonic reaches out his hand to help him, but Metal rejects it, telling him "there is only one Sonic" before being destroyed by the rising magma. Robotnik states he still has Sonic's DNA and can re-build Metal Sonic, but one of his missiles from the fight inadvertently blows up the disc containing Sonic's DNA. Knuckles then punches Sonic as revenge for Sonic accidentally stepping on him during the brawl, and the two get into a chase, with all the others following behind, ending the episode.

Cast

Production and release 
The OVA series was produced by Studio Pierrot, Sega Enterprises and General Entertainment under the supervision of Sonic Team, Yuji Naka and Naoto Ohshima. It is directed and storyboarded by Kazuho Ikegami, with Mayori Sekijima handling the story structure, Masashi Kubota writing the scripts, Tsuneo Ninomiya designing the characters and Mitsuhiro Tada composing the music. Both episodes feature an ending theme "LOOK-ALIKE," composed and arranged by Tada and written and sung by Riyu Konaka. The OVA was originally distributed by Taki Corporation in Japan on a rental-only basis between January 26 and March 22 before being released for retail sale on May 31, 1996.

ADV Films announced they had licensed the OVA series at Project A-Kon 9, which took place in May 1998. It was dubbed in English and released as a single direct-to-video film titled Sonic the Hedgehog: The Movie on VHS and DVD on September 7, 1999, to coincide with the international release of Sonic Adventure for the Dreamcast. It was later re-released on DVD on January 13, 2004. Due to ADV Films being dissolved and its assets being spun off into Section23 Films and Sentai Filmworks, both releases are now out of print.

Commercial performance 
In the United States, it reached number 7 on the Billboard video sales chart and number 6 on the Billboard kids' video sales chart.

Critical reception 
The March 1996 issue of the DieHard Magazine gave the OVA a positive review stating that "all in all, the artwork looks amazing, plus it's an O.V.A., so the artists have been given quite an extensive budget. The animation is much cleaner than you could ever expect from a TV show, but the characters on-screen presence is what really makes Sonic so cool. It's like playing the game, but in anime form. After the U.S. Sonic cartoon has been canceled, this anime is definitely a good choice."

Henry Gilbert of GamesRadar approved of the concept of a colorful, fast-paced anime adaptation of Sonic, noting the fights between Sonic and his evil counterpart, Metal Sonic, as "cool." This is unfortunately accompanied by "scenes of slapstick humor, anime cliches, and childish voice acting" as well as the "perpetually annoying" Sara.

Chris Shepard of Anime News Network praised the OVA for its non-traditional action and said it was "good for Sonic fans". He called the English dub poor, and said the story "strayed from the video games a little too much" and it was "very basic".

John Sinnott of DVD Talk remarked "it didn’t really pull me in at any time."

Fan project 

In 2020, 3GI Industries, who had previously created Shrek Retold, released Sonic Rebuilt, a recreation of the film by over 200 artists.

References

External links 

  
  
 

1996 anime OVAs
Anime film and television articles using incorrect naming style
ADV Films
Films about lookalikes
OVAs based on video games
Pierrot (company)
Sonic the Hedgehog films
Television pilots not picked up as a series